Earline W. Parmon (November 18, 1943 – March 15, 2016) was an American politician.
Born in Buffalo, New York, Parmon graduated from Winston-Salem State University. She served as a Democratic member of the North Carolina General Assembly representing the state's seventy-second House district, including constituents in Forsyth County. An education consultant from Winston-Salem, North Carolina, Parmon has served five terms in the state House from 2002 to 2013. She announced in 2012 that she would run for a seat in the North Carolina Senate. Parmon served in the North Carolina Senate from 2013 until her resignation in 2015. Parmon also served as Forsyth County, North Carolina commissioner. Parmon died on March 15, 2016.

Electoral history

2014

2012

2010

2008

2006

2004

2002

References

External links
Parmon campaign site

|-

1943 births
2016 deaths
People from Buffalo, New York
Politicians from Buffalo, New York
People from Winston-Salem, North Carolina
Politicians from Winston-Salem, North Carolina
Winston-Salem State University alumni
African-American state legislators in North Carolina
Women state legislators in North Carolina
20th-century African-American people
20th-century African-American women
21st-century African-American women
21st-century American politicians
21st-century African-American politicians
21st-century American women politicians
County commissioners in North Carolina
Democratic Party members of the North Carolina House of Representatives
Democratic Party North Carolina state senators